Searchlight Books was a series of essays published as hardback books, edited by T. R. Fyvel and George Orwell. The series was published by Secker & Warburg.

The series was projected for 17 titles, of which ten were published during 1941-42, but bomb damage to Warburg's office and the destruction of his printer's paper stock led to the series being discontinued.

The first in the series, The Lion and the Unicorn, was published on 19 February 1941 with an initial run of 5,000 copies, but the number was raised to 7,500. A second printing of 5,000 copies was ordered in March 1941. It sold over 10,000 copies (and was among the most commercially successful of Orwell's books to that date). The destruction of the stock by bombs ended its sales.

Publications by Searchlight Books included the following

No 1: The Lion and the Unicorn (1941) by George Orwell
No 2: Offensive Against Germany (1941) by Sebastian Haffner
No 3: The Lesson of London by Ritchie Calder
No 4: The English at War (1941) by Cassandra and Philip Zec
No 5: The End of the Old School Tie by T. C. Worsley - with foreword by George Orwell
No 7: Above All Things - Liberty by Michael Foot
No 8: The Artist and the New World by Cyril Connolly
No 10: Struggle for the Spanish Soul (1941) by Arturo Barea
No 11: The Case for African Freedom (1941) by Joyce Cary - with foreword by George Orwell
No 12: Can Britain and America Unite? by B. E. Catlin 
No 13: The Streets of Europe by Arthur Koestler
No 15: The Moral Blitz: War Propaganda and Christianity by Bernard Causton
No 16: Beyond the "Isms" by Olaf Stapledon
No 18: Life and the Poet (1942) by Stephen Spender

Number of publication not known

Dover Front by Reginald Foster

Included in the initial project but published after the series was cancelled

 Parents' Revolt by Richard and Kathleen Titmuss

See also
Bibliography of George Orwell

References

George Orwell
Book publishing companies of the United Kingdom